Enas or ENAS may refer to:

 Enas & enas, a 2000 Greek language film
 Ny-Ålesund Airport, Hamnerabben, Svalbard, Norway

See also
 Ena (disambiguation)